Regiopolis - Notre Dame Catholic Secondary School  (sometimes abbreviated to RND or "Regi") is a secondary school located in Kingston, Ontario, Canada offering grades 9 to 12. It is  one of three schools in Kingston that offer the International Baccalaureate (IB) program, and is Canada's oldest English Catholic high school.

International Baccalaureate Diploma program
At Regiopolis-Notre Dame, the International Baccalaureate program boasts smaller-than-average class sizes and strong student-teacher connections with an emphasis on philosophic and critical thought. With over a thousand students attending RND, the "IB experience" offers peer interaction on a smaller scale with the option of joining the school's many extracurricular teams, clubs, and activities.

Pre-International Baccalaureate occurs in grades 9 and 10. In Grade 11 (Year 1 IB) and 12 (Year 2 IB), students are enrolled in the Diploma program. Simultaneously, these students also earn credit towards the provincial OSSD diploma. Some students opt to participate in earning IB Certificates as an alternative to the full IB Diploma program.

History

The Diocese of Kingston under Bishop Alexander Macdonell obtained a charter from the Legislative Assembly of Upper Canada on March 4, 1837 to establish the College of Regiopolis. Construction began in 1839 and the institution opened in 1842. A sister school for girls, Notre Dame was founded in 1841.

Regiopolis originally functioned as a secondary school, seminary and college and was given university status and degree granting powers in 1866. However, due to financial difficulties, the college closed in 1869. In 1892, Regiopolis' five story stone building on Sydenham Street became the new location of Hotel Dieu Hospital.

Also in 1892, James Vincent Cleary, Kingston's first archbishop, reopened Regiopolis College on King Street as a secondary school for boys. In 1914, the school moved to its present location on Russell Street in northern Kingston. William Newlands Jr. (architect) designed the main building (1914), dormitory and gymnasium (1925).

The Jesuit Fathers of Upper Canada took over operation of the school in 1931 and operated it for the next forty years. They utilized Regiopolis' university charter to graduate six Bachelor of Arts recipients in 1941 and 1942 but abandoned the post-secondary project once and for all due to low enrollment and limited resources.

The Congregation of Notre Dame was invited to Kingston by Bishop Macdonnell to establish a girls' school. They began conducting classes in 1841, first on King Street and then in a house on Earl Street. In 1846, they established a permanent school at the corner of Bagot and Johnson Streets and remained there until the late 1960s.

The two schools were merged in 1967 when operating costs became too high for separate boys' and girls' institutions to be viable and moved to the Regiopolis College site taking the name Regiopolis-Notre Dame. The Jesuit Fathers withdrew from the operation of the school in 1970 and the Frontenac Lennox and Addington County Roman Catholic Separate School Board took over jurisdiction while the Sisters of Notre Dame continued their involvement.

The present building opened in 1977 and expanded twice, in 1993 and 2004. The 2004 expansion added a second gym to the school, which now is the site of most Regi sporting events, school masses, and spirit rallies.

Athletics
Regiopolis-Notre Dame currently fields teams in both boys (15) and girls (14) divisions - including soccer, basketball, volleyball, football, field hockey, track and field, badminton, tennis, hockey, rugby, wrestling and cross country.  RND sports teams use the name "Panthers" - the previous "Redskins" name was dropped due to its insensitivity.  School colours are Garnet and Gold.

Regi's senior boys' volleyball team has become a perennial provincial contender at the AAA level, having won OFSAA gold on four separate occasions - first in 2002, then winning back to back titles in 2009 & 2010 and most recently in 2014.  The senior boys' soccer team also captured an OFSAA gold medal at the 2006 tournament held in Kingston.  Regi is also home to the national ranked co-ed cheerleading national champions (2001-2011)

Notable alumni
Cory Greenwood, NFL player Detroit Lions
Gerald Bull, engineer and artillery developer, designer of the Project Babylon "supergun"
Scott Harrington, hockey player
Bonnie Henry, Chief Medical Officer of Health, British Columbia

See also
List of high schools in Ontario

References

External links

 School website
 RND Scoreboard
 School website-History

High schools in Kingston, Ontario
International Baccalaureate schools in Ontario
Educational institutions established in 1837
1837 establishments in Canada